Somewhere Between Free Men and Slaves is the first full-length studio album by Canadian hard rock band Organ Thieves, released on April 24, 2012, through MapleMusic Recordings, through the Canada iTunes service, later followed by a physical CD release on May 8, 2012.

Background
The band recorded most of the album in 5 days, between October 2–October 7, 2010, at BTown Sound in Burlington, Ontario, with producer Greig Nori who has previously worked with Dave Baksh in Sum 41 and with Chuck Coles and Matt Worobec in Cauterize, with pre-production beginning in late 2009. Additional recording took place in Coalition Studio in May 2011. The band has said many times that they prefer to self-release the album, rather than release it through a label, though on November 21, 2011, it was announced that the band has signed with MapleMusic Recordings, who would release the album.

The album was originally set for release for Spring 2011, then it was delayed until the summer, when the band decided to re-record some songs and it was delayed once again. On January 30, 2012, it was announced that the album would be released on April 24, 2012. The album's release was supported with a single show in Toronto, Ontario on March 21, supporting the recently reunited Treble Charger, whose frontman Greig Nori is the producer of the album.

Track listing

Working titles
"Workers" - "Workers Get Paid"
"Phoebe" - "GGC [Grandma's Got Cancer]" / "Long Way Home"
"Kickin' Stones"
"Disaster"

Personnel
Chuck Coles - lead vocals, guitar
Dave Baksh - guitar
Mike Smith – bass
Theo McKibbon – drums, percussion

References

2012 debut albums
Organ Thieves albums
MapleMusic Recordings albums
Albums produced by Greig Nori